Gökhan Sazdağı (born 20 September 1994) is a Turkish professional footballer who plays as a midfielder for the Turkish club Kayserispor.

Professional career
A youth product of Selimiyespor and Fenerbahçe, Sazdağı signed his first professional contract with Fenerbahçe on 8 July 2013. He spent his early career on loan with Turgutluspor and Manisaspor He then moved to Gaziantep, and had stints with the semi-pro clubs Fatih Karagümrük, Hatayspor, and Boluspor. On 26 June 2021, he transferred to Kayserispor in the Turkish Süper Lig. He made his professional debut with Kayserispor in a 3–0 Süper Lig to Altay on 14 August 2021.

References

External links
 
 

1994 births
Living people
People from Üsküdar
Footballers from Istanbul
Turkish footballers
Fenerbahçe S.K. footballers
Turgutluspor footballers
Manisaspor footballers
Gaziantep F.K. footballers
Fatih Karagümrük S.K. footballers
Hatayspor footballers
Adanaspor footballers
Boluspor footballers
Kayserispor footballers
Süper Lig players
TFF First League players
TFF Second League players
Association football midfielders